1996 Avispa Fukuoka season

Review and events

League results summary

League results by round

Competitions

Domestic results

J.League

Emperor's Cup

J.League Cup

Player statistics

 † player(s) joined the team after the opening of this season.

Transfers

In:

Out:

Transfers during the season

In
 Satoshi Fujimoto (from Blaze Kumamoto)
 Hideaki Mori (from Sanfrecce Hiroshima)
 Takeshi Hibi (from Juntendo University)

Out
 Yoshiyuki Takemoto (to Tokyo Gas)

Awards

none

References

Other pages
 J.League official site
 Avispa Fukuoka official site

Avispa Fukuoka
Avispa Fukuoka seasons